Morden is a London Underground station in Morden in the London Borough of Merton. The station is the southern terminus for the Northern line and is ironically the most southerly station on the Underground network, despite being on the Northern Line. The station is located on London Road (A24), and is in Travelcard Zone 4. Nearby are Morden Hall Park and Morden Park.

The station was one of the first modernist designs produced for the London Underground by Charles Holden. Its opening in 1926 contributed to the rapid development of new suburbs in what was then a rural part of Surrey with the population of the parish increasing nine-fold in the decade 1921–1931.

History
In the period following the end of First World War, the Underground Electric Railways Company of London (UERL) began reviving a series of prewar plans for line extensions and improvements that had been postponed during the hostilities. Finance for the works was made possible by the government's Trade Facilities Act 1921, which, as a means of alleviating unemployment, provided for the Treasury to underwrite the value of loans raised by companies for public works.

One of the projects that had been postponed was the Wimbledon and Sutton Railway (W&SR), a plan for a new surface line from Wimbledon to Sutton over which the UERL's District Railway had control. The UERL wished to maximise its use of the government's time-limited financial backing, and, in November 1922, presented bills to parliament to construct the W&SR in conjunction with an extension of the UERL's City and South London Railway (C&SLR) south from  through Balham, Tooting and Merton.

The C&SLR would connect to the W&SR route south of Morden station and run trains to Sutton and the District Railway would run trains between Wimbledon and Sutton. Under these proposals, the station on the C&SLR extension would have been named "North Morden" and the station on the W&SR route would have been called "South Morden" (the current Morden South station is in a different location). The proposals also included a depot at Morden for use by both District Railway and C&SLR trains.

The Southern Railway objected to this encroachment into its area of operation and the anticipated loss of its passenger traffic to the C&SLR's more direct route to central London. The UERL and SR reached an agreement in July 1923 that enabled the C&SLR to extend as far as Morden in exchange for the UERL giving up its rights over the W&SR route. Construction of the C&SLR extension was rapidly carried out and Morden station was opened on 13 September 1926.

Once the station was opened, the UERL established Morden station, the southernmost on the system, as the hub for numerous bus routes heading further into suburban south London and northern Surrey. These routes had a significant impact on the Southern Railway's main line operations in the area, with the SR estimating in 1928 that it had lost approximately four million passengers per year. The UERL though was able to demonstrate that its passenger numbers on its buses to Sutton station were actually more than double those for Morden. Across the road from the station, the UERL opened its own petrol station (the first of its kind in the country) and garage where commuters with cars, or bicycles, could leave their vehicles during the day. The opening of the C&SLR and the Wimbledon to Sutton line led to rapid construction of suburban housing throughout the area. The population of the parish of Morden, previously the most rural of the areas through which the lines passed, increased from 1,355 in 1921 to 12,618 in 1931 and 35,417 in 1951.

A post-war review of rail transport in the London area produced a report in 1946 that proposed many new lines and identified the Morden branch as being the most overcrowded section of the London Underground, needing additional capacity. To relieve the congestion and to provide a new service south of Morden, the report recommended construction of a second pair of tunnels beneath the northern line's tunnels from Tooting Broadway to Kennington and an extension from Morden to North Cheam. Trains using the existing tunnels would start and end at Tooting Broadway with the service in the new tunnels joining the existing tunnels to Morden. The extension to North Cheam would run in tunnel. Designated as routes 10 and 11, these proposals were not developed by the London Passenger Transport Board or its successor organisations.

Station building

Morden in 1926 was a rural area and the station was built on open farmland, giving its architect, Charles Holden, more space than had been available for the majority of the stations on the new extension which were located in already built-up areas. The stations on the Morden extension were Holden's first major project for the Underground. He was selected by Frank Pick, general manager of the UERL, to design the stations after he was dissatisfied with designs produced by the UERL's own architect, Stanley Heaps.

In a letter to his friend Harry Peach, a fellow member of the Design and Industries Association (DIA), Pick explained his choice of Holden: "I may say that we are going to build our stations upon the Morden extension railway to the most modern pattern. We are going to discard entirely all ornament. We are going to build in reinforced concrete. The station will be simply a hole in the wall, everything being sacrificed to the doorway and some notice above to tell you to what the doorway leads. We are going to represent the DIA gone mad, and in order that I may go mad in good company I have got Holden to see that we do it properly."

Built with a range of shops to both sides, the modernist design of the entrance vestibule takes the form of a double-height box clad in white Portland stone with a three-part glazed screen on the front façade divided by columns of which the capitals are three-dimensional versions of the Underground roundel. The central panel of the screen contains a large version of the roundel. The ticket hall beyond is octagonal with a central roof light of the same shape. The ticket hall originally had a pair of wooden ticket booths (passimeters) from which tickets were issued and collected, but these were removed when modern ticketing systems made them redundant.

The main structure of the station and the shops to each side was designed with the intention of taking upward development on its roof, though this did not come until around 1960 when three storeys of office building were added.

Unlike the other stations built for the extension, the station's platforms are not in tunnels, but in a wide cutting with the tunnel portals a short distance to the north. Three tracks run through the station to the depot, and the station has three platforms, two of which are island platforms with tracks on each side. The platforms are accessed by steps down from the ticket hall and are numbered 1 to 5 from east to west; the island platforms have different numbers for each face (2/3 and 4/5). To indicate departures, the platforms are usually referred to as 2, 3 and 5. The tunnel portals are one end of the longest tunnel on the London Underground running  to  via the Bank branch.

Refurbishment and improvement works completed in 2007 included new and reconstructed cross bridges between platforms and the installation of lifts for mobility impaired passengers. Cosmetic improvements carried out at the same time included the reinstatement of pole-mounted roundels on the sides of the entrance vestibule. Other work in the 2000s at the station includes the construction of a substantial air rights building spanning across the cutting.

The station is locally listed by Merton Council as being of architectural interest, though not statutorily listed like the others on the Morden extension.

Services and connections
The station sits at the southern end of the Northern line in London fare zone 4. It is the southernmost station on the whole London Underground network. The next station to the north is South Wimbledon. Train frequencies vary throughout the day, but generally operate every 2–5 minutes between 05:15 and 00:05.

London Bus routes 80, 93, 118, 154, 157, 163, 164, 201, 293, 413, 470 and K5, and night routes N133 and N155 serve the station.

Future
If built, a planned extension to the Tramlink light rail system would create a new tram interchange close to Morden, offering tram services to Sutton via St Helier.

Notes and references

Notes

References

Bibliography

External links

Historic photographs of the station:
London Transport Museum Photographs Collection

Other photographs of Morden station
London Borough of Merton: Merton Memories Photographic Archive
Historic film of the station:
 Silent newsreel footage of Lt-Col. John Moore-Brabazon junior Transport Minister opening the Morden extension.

Northern line stations
Tube stations in the London Borough of Merton
Former City and South London Railway stations
Railway stations in Great Britain opened in 1926
Morden
London Underground Night Tube stations
Charles Holden railway stations